Aziridine is an organic compound consisting of the three-membered heterocycle . It is a colorless, toxic, volatile liquid that is of significant practical interest.  Aziridine was discovered in 1888 by the chemist Siegmund Gabriel. Its derivatives, also referred to as aziridines, are of broader interest in medicinal chemistry.

Structure 
The bond angles in aziridine are approximately 60°, considerably less than the normal hydrocarbon bond angle of 109.5°, which results in angle strain as in the comparable cyclopropane and ethylene oxide molecules. A banana bond model explains bonding in such compounds. Aziridine is less basic than acyclic aliphatic amines, with a pKa of 7.9 for the conjugate acid, due to increased s character of the nitrogen free electron pair. Angle strain in aziridine also increases the barrier to nitrogen inversion. This barrier height permits the isolation of separate invertomers, for example the cis and trans invertomers of N-chloro-2-methylaziridine.

Synthesis and uses

Aziridine is produced industrially from aminoethanol via two related routes.  The Nippon Shokubai process requires an oxide catalyst and high temperatures to effect the dehydration.  In the Wenker synthesis, the aminoethanol is converted to the sulfate ester, which undergoes base-induced sulfate elimination.  Older methods entailed amination of 1,2-dichloroethane and cyclization of 2-chloroethylamine.

Aziridine forms a wide variety of polymeric derivatives, known as polyethylenimines (PEI). These and related species are useful crosslinking agents and precursors for coatings.

Safety
Aziridine is highly toxic with an LD50 of 14 mg (oral, rats).  It is a skin irritant. As an alkylating agent, it is also a mutagen. It is reactive toward DNA, potentially relevant to its mutagenicity. Aziridine containing compounds also appear to be similarly dangerous.

See also 
Binary ethylenimine, a dimeric form of aziridine

References 

Functional groups
IARC Group 2B carcinogens
Aziridines